The men's featherweight event was part of the boxing programme at the 1976 Summer Olympics. The weight class allowed boxers of up to 57 kilograms to compete. The competition was held from 18 to 31 July 1976. 26 boxers from 26 nations competed.

Medalists

Results
The following boxers took part in the event:

First round
 Rai Sik (IND) def. Andeh Davidson (NGA), walk-over
 Angel Pacheco (VEN) def. Sandalio Calderón (COL), 5:0
 Carlos Calderon (PUR) def. Boukary Assakande (BUR), walk-over

Second round
 René Weller (FRG) def. Serge Thomas (FRA), 3:2
 Gheorghe Ciochină (ROM) def. Jackson Ouma (KEN), walk-over
 Richard Nowakowski (GDR) def. Ruben Mares (PHI), 5:0
 Behzad Ghaedi Bardeh (IRN) def. John Sichula (ZAM), walk-over
 Camille Huard (CAN) def. Bachir Koual (ALG), walk-over
 Leszek Kosedowski (POL) def. Cornelius Boza-Edwards (UGA), walk-over
 Bratislav Ristić (YUG) def. Mohamed Younes Naguib (EGY), walk-over
 Gustavo de la Cruz (DOM) def. Rumen Peshev (BUL), 5:0
 Juan Paredes (MEX) def. Raimundo Alves (BRA), 5:0
 Yukio Odagiri (JPN) def. Ravsalyn Otgonbayar (MGL), KO-2
 Clarence Robinson (JAM) def. Jonathan Magagula (SUA), walk-over
 Choon Gil-Choi (KOR) def. Piniit Boonjuang (THA), KO-1
 Dave Armstrong (USA) def. Anatoly Volkov (URS), 5:0
 Tibor Badari (HUN) def. Gizaw Asefa (ETH), walk-over
 Ángel Herrera (CUB) def. Rai Sik (IND), KO-1
 Angel Pacheco (VEN) def. Carlos Calderón (PUR), 5:0

Third round
 Gheorghe Ciochină (ROM) def. René Weller (FRG), 4:1
 Richard Nowakowski (GDR) def. Behzad Ghaedi Bardeh (IRN), RSC-3
 Leszek Kosedowski (POL) def. Camille Huard (CAN), 5:0
 Bratislav Ristić (YUG) def. Gustavo de la Cruz (DOM), 4:1
 Juan Paredes (MEX) def. Yukio Odagiri (JPN), 3:2
 Choon Gil-Choi (KOR) def. Clarence Robinson (JAM), DSQ-3
 Dave Armstrong (USA) def. Tibor Badari (HUN), 5:0
 Ángel Herrera (CUB) def. Angel Pacheco (VEN), 5:0

Quarterfinals
 Richard Nowakowski (GDR) def. Gheorghe Ciochină (ROM), RSC-3
 Leszek Kosedowski (POL) def. Bratislav Ristić (YUG), 5:0
 Juan Paredes (MEX) def. Choon Gil-Choi (KOR), 4:1
 Ángel Herrera (CUB) def. Dave Armstrong (USA), 3:2

Semifinals
 Richard Nowakowski (GDR) def. Leszek Kosedowski (POL), 5:0
 Ángel Herrera (CUB) def. Juan Paredes (MEX), 5:0

Final
 Ángel Herrera (CUB) def. Richard Nowakowski (GDR), KO-2

References

Featherweight